Strathmore School is Kenya's first multi-racial school, established in 1961 in the Lavington area of Nairobi. It began as a residential Sixth Form College offering British-styled A-level courses and in 1963 switched from the Cambridge School Certificate Examination to the London GCE. In 1977 it became a full-fledged Secondary school.  In 1988, the school began offering education under the KCSE - Kenya Certificate of Secondary Education - curricula which it follows to date. The first batch of Primary school students (6-7 year olds) entered in 1987. It no longer has any boarders.

School uniform
The school uniform consists of a cream/beige shirt, mid-grey trousers, grey socks and black shoes. The tie has black, white and blue stripes. The blazer (worn by high school students) is navy blue, normally worn on Mondays and on days of special events. The sweater is sky blue/air force blue and does not have the school badge on it.

School magazine
'The Scroll' was first published in 1963. The last edition was published in 2006 in order to make way for an interactive DVD called The Scroll Digital (nicknamed 'digital'). A return to the past is happening this year with a school magazine being published for the first time in 10 years.

In 1986 a book titled 'Strathmore Remembered', with the 25-year history of the school was published.

School honours
Every year the school honours two outstanding students graduating. One being the Sportsman of the Year, and the other the Scholar of the Year. Those who are honoured have their names engraved on an 'Honours Board' at the school. There is also an Honours Board for the Primary School Scholar of the Year. 

Since 1961, only two people have been awarded both Honours, James McFie in 1963 and Andrew Lumumba in 2012.

Every year the top three [in primary] and top five [in secondary] all-rounded students in each class are awarded the school pennant. The school does not award any colours to students.

Sports teams
The rugby team is known as The Bandits. In 2008 they were the winners of the St. Mary's Blackrock Festival, the biggest schools rugby festival in Kenya. However, they were beaten by their rivals Saints, the eventual winners in the finals of the 2010 edition of the festival. They wear striped shirts of black, blue and white.

Other teams include the Pirates (basketball), the Stallions, who renamed themselves the Falcons in 2016 (volleyball), who won the Nairobi provincial league several times in the 1970s, the Stalwarts (cricket) and the Sharks (swimming).

The doctrinal and religious formation in Strathmore is entrusted to Opus Dei, a prelature of the Catholic Church.

Strathmore School consistently ranks as one of the top private schools in the KCSE and was ranked the second best high school (nationwide) based on 2006 Kenya Certificate of Secondary Education and the second best private high school in 2013 Kenya Certificate of Secondary Education.

Notable alumni

Dan 'chizi' Aceda, Musician
Daniel Adongo, American football player
Christopher Kirubi, businessman and owner of Two Rivers mall, Nairobi, Kenya
George Magoha, former head of the Ministry of Education
Mbithi Masya, Film Producer
David Mathenge aka Nameless (musician)
Gideon Moi, politician
Chris Okemo, 8th Minister for Finance of Kenya
Dalmas Otieno, politician.
Polycarp Otieno, musician and member of afro-pop band Sauti Sol
Michael Kijana Wamalwa, 8th Vice President of Kenya

References

External links
 Strathmore School official website

High schools and secondary schools in Kenya
Schools in Nairobi
Educational institutions established in 1961
1961 establishments in Kenya
Elementary and primary schools in Kenya